This is a survey of the postage stamps and postal history of Georgia.

Georgia is in the Caucasus region of Eurasia. Situated at the juncture of Eastern Europe and Western Asia, it is bounded to the west by the Black Sea, to the north by Russia, to the south by Turkey and Armenia, and to the east by Azerbaijan. Georgia covers a territory of 69,700 km² and its population is 4.385 million.

At the beginning of the 19th century, Georgia was annexed by the Russian Empire. After a brief period of independence following the Russian Revolution of 1917, Georgia was invaded by Bolshevik armies in 1921 and incorporated into the Soviet Union in 1922. The independence of Georgia was restored in 1991.

First stamps 
The first stamps of Georgia as the Democratic Republic of Georgia were issued on 26 May 1919. A further series was issued in 1921.

Georgian Soviet Socialist Republic 
In January and February 1922 a series of five stamps were issued for Georgia's membership as a Soviet Republic.

Transcaucasian Socialist Federative Soviet Republic 
In March 1922 until September 1923 overprinted stamps of The Transcaucasian Socialist Federative Soviet Republic were used. From 1 October 1923 general issues of the Transcaucasian Federation were used.

Soviet stamps 
From 1924 until 1993 stamps of the Soviet Union were used in Georgia following the absorption of the Transcaucasian Socialist Federative Soviet Republic into the U.S.S.R.

Independence 
Following the fall of the Soviet Union, Georgia became independent again in April 1991 and issued stamps in its own name from 31 July 1993. Unlike other ex-Soviet republics, Georgia did not overprint Soviet stamps to meet their postal needs after independence, although a number of overprints were carried out on Georgian stamps in 1994.

Abkhazia
Stamps have been produced purporting to be from the Republic of Abkhazia, an area in western Georgia that is not recognised as a sovereign state by all but few countries. Most stamps of Abkhazia are believed to be bogus, produced in foreign countries solely for sale to collectors, but more recently Abkhazia has produced stamps that may have legitimate use locally within the borders of the disputed area. They are not recognised by the UPU.

See also 
Postage stamps of Batum under British occupation

References

Further reading
 Ashford, Peter T. Georgia: Postal Cancellations 1918-1923. Ashton: P. Ashford, 1991 158p.
 Barefoot, John & Andrew Hall. Georgia. York: Barefoot Investments, 1983  66p. Series Title: European Philately; 11.
 Hughes, William E. and P.T. Ashford. The Postage Stamps of Georgia (Transcaucasia); The Stamps of St. George. Bristol: P. Ashford, in association with the British Society of Russian Philately, 1951 46p.

External links 
Philately of the former Soviet Union.

History of Georgia (country) by topic
Postal system of Georgia (country)
Georgia